Page most commonly refers to:
 Page (paper), one side of a leaf of paper, as in a book

Page, PAGE, pages, or paging may also refer to:

Roles
 Page (assistance occupation), a professional occupation
 Page (servant), traditionally a young male servant
 Page (wedding attendant)

People with the name
 Page (given name)
 Page (surname)

Places

Australia
 Page, Australian Capital Territory, a suburb of Canberra
 Division of Page, New South Wales
 Pages River, a tributary of the Hunter River catchment in New South Wales, Australia
 The Pages, South Australia, two islands and a reef
The Pages Conservation Park, a protected area in South Australia

United States
 Page, Arizona, a city
 Page, Indiana
 Page, Minneapolis, Minnesota, a neighborhood
 Page, Nebraska, a village
 Page, North Dakota, a city
 Page, Oklahoma, an unincorporated community
 Page, Virginia
 Page, Washington, a ghost town
 Page, West Virginia, a census-designated place
 Page Airport (disambiguation)
 Page City, Kansas
 Page County (disambiguation)
 Page Township (disambiguation)
 Page Valley, Virginia

Science and technology

Computing
 Page (computer memory), a block of virtual memory
 Paging, a method of data retrieval
 Bank switching, sometimes known as paging
 Electronic page, formatting digital documents into pages
 Multiple buffering, also known as paging
 Ogg page, a unit of data in an Ogg bitstream
 Pages (word processor), a word processor and page layout application from Apple Inc.
 Web page

Other uses in science and technology
 Page, to use a pager to contact a person
 PAGE, the acronym of Polyacrylamide gel electrophoresis
 SDS-PAGE, sodium dodecyl sulfate polyacrylamide gel electrophoresis
 PAGE XML (Page Analysis and Ground-Truth Elements), an XML-based page image representation framework that records information on image characteristics 
 Skirt lifter, a device for use with a long skirt, also known as a page

Arts, entertainment, and media

Literature
 Page (novel), a 2000 novel by Tamora Pierce
 Page, a 2002 posthumous collection of poetry by Hannah Weiner

Music

Groups and labels
 Page Music, a record label
 Page (South Korean band), a Korean outfit
 Page (Swedish band), a Swedish synthpop outfit
 Pages (band), an American pop rock band

Recordings
Page (album), by Kang Seung-yoon, 2021
 "Page", a song by Vixen from the album Tangerine, 1998
 "Page", a song by Band-Maid from the album Conqueror, 2019
 Pages (EP), a 2007 EP by There for Tomorrow
 Pages (Shane & Shane album), 2007
 Pages (Sexy Zone album), 2019
 Pages, a 2005 album by Bering Strait
 Pages, a 2009 album by Julie Feeney
 Pages, a 2012 album by Versailles

Other uses
 Page, an announcement requesting someone's presence; see Public address
 Page, a brand of toilet paper in the Netherlands by Kimberly-Clark
 PAGE, the acronym of the Obama initiative Presidential Ambassadors for Global Entrepreneurship
 PAGE, the acronym of the Pakistan & Gulf Economist, a weekly business magazine published from Karachi, Pakistan
 Page Corps, a military academy in Imperial Russia
 Page Organ Company, producer of theatre organs
 Page playoff system, a playoff format used primarily in softball and curling at the championship level
 Past Global Changes, a project of the International Geosphere-Biosphere Programme

See also
 Justice Page (disambiguation)
 Page boy (disambiguation)
 Pager (disambiguation)
 Paige (disambiguation)